In linear algebra, the Rule of Sarrus is a mnemonic device for computing the determinant of a  matrix named after the French mathematician Pierre Frédéric Sarrus.

Consider a  matrix

then its determinant can be computed by the following scheme.

Write out the first two columns of the matrix to the right of the third column, giving five columns in a row. Then add the products of the diagonals going from top to bottom (solid) and subtract the products of the diagonals going from bottom to top (dashed). This yields

A similar scheme based on diagonals works for  matrices:

Both are special cases of the Leibniz formula, which however does not yield similar memorization schemes for larger matrices. Sarrus' rule can also be derived using the Laplace expansion of a  matrix.

Another way of thinking of Sarrus' rule is to imagine that the matrix is wrapped around a cylinder, such that the right and left edges are joined.

References

External links
Sarrus' rule at Planetmath
Linear Algebra: Rule of Sarrus of Determinants  at khanacademy.org

Linear algebra